Parmar Run is a  long 1st order tributary to Scott Run in Brooke County, West Virginia. This is the only stream of this name in the United States.

Course
Parmar Run rises about 2 miles east of Mechling Hill in Washington County on the Pennsylvania State Line and then flows southwest into West Virginia to join Scott Run at Scott Run, West Virginia.

Watershed
Parmar Run drains  of area, receives about 40.2 in/year of precipitation, has a wetness index of 317.44, and is about 54% forested.

See also
List of Rivers of West Virginia
List of Rivers of Pennsylvania

References

Rivers of Pennsylvania
Rivers of West Virginia
Rivers of Washington County, Pennsylvania
Rivers of Brooke County, West Virginia